The following is the list of squads for each of the 14 teams competing in the EuroBasket 1995, held in Greece between 21 June and 2 July 1995. Each team selected a squad of 12 players for the tournament.

Group A

Germany

Greece

Israel

Italy

Lithuania

Sweden

FR Yugoslavia

Group B

Croatia

Finland
}

France

Russia

Slovenia

Spain

Turkey

References
 1995 European Championship for Men, FIBA.com.
 European Championship 1995 - National Squads, LinguaSport.com.

1995